is a Japanese table tennis player. With doubles partner Yuya Oshima, he won the gold medal in the men's doubles event at both the 2015 and 2017 ITTF World Tour Grand Finals, as well as winning a silver medal in men's doubles at the 2017 World Championships.

Career records
The following senior career records stand as of April 2018:

Singles
ITTF World Tour
Runner-up: 2014 Spanish Open
Asian Championships: Last 32 (2015)
Summer Universiade: Winner (2015, 2017)

Men's doubles
World Championships: Runner-up (2017); QF (2015)
ITTF World Tour Grand Finals: Winner (2015, 2017); Runner-up (2016)
ITTF World Tour
Winner: 2014 Czech Open, 2015 Croatia Open, 2016 German Open, 2016 Polish Open, 2017 India Open, 2017 Qatar Open
Runner-up: 2013 Polish Open
Asian Championships: SF (2015); QF (2017)
Summer Universiade: Winner (2017); Runner-up (2015)

Mixed doubles
Asian Championships: Runner-up (2017); QF (2015)
Summer Universiade: QF (2015)

Team
World Team Cup: QF (2015)
Asian Championships: Runner-up (2015)
Summer Universiade: Runner-up (2015, 2017)

References

Japanese male table tennis players
1995 births
Sportspeople from Tokyo
Living people
Universiade medalists in table tennis
World Table Tennis Championships medalists
Table tennis players at the 2018 Asian Games
Universiade gold medalists for Japan
Universiade silver medalists for Japan
Asian Games competitors for Japan
Medalists at the 2015 Summer Universiade
Medalists at the 2017 Summer Universiade